Dacochordodes is a genus of worms belonging to the family Chordodidae.

Species:
 Dacochordodes bacescui Capuse, 1965

References

Nematomorpha